Rai Bahadur Hem Chandra Bose was an Indian police officer and mathematician at the Calcutta Anthropometric Bureau (later the Fingerprint Bureau). Supervised by Edward Henry, he and Azizul Haque developed the Henry Classification System for cataloging fingerprints.

Life and career

Bose was born in 1867 in Damurhuda Upazila of the then Nadia District of Bengal Presidency, currently Chuadanga District of Bangladesh, in a Kayastha family. His father was a postman. After topping the matriculation examination in the year 1883 from Jessore Zilla School, he studied Mathematics at the Sanskrit College of Calcutta on a Scholarship from the Natore Raj, and completed his Bachelor of Science in 1888. He joined the Bengal Police Service as a sub inspector in 1889. Between 1889 and 1894 he was posted as an investigating officer in police stations in districts including Madhubani, Saharsa, Pabna and Narail of the then United Bengal. His keen detective work was noticed and in 1894 he was posted at the Directorate Headquarters of the Criminal Investigation Department, or CID, of Bengal Police in Calcutta. There he worked on the fingerprinting system, and remained posted at the CID headquarters, except for a short stint as Instructor at the Sardah Police Training School in 1914–1917, until his retirement as a DySP in 1925. After his retirement he lived in a small apartment in Maniktala in Calcutta with his family, till his death from natural causes in 3/1 April 1949. His grandson Amiya Bhusan Bose joined the West Bengal Police Service in the 1952 batch of the WBCS, and retired as a DIG of West Bengal Police in 1988.

Haque and Bose (1897)
On 12 June 1897, the Council of the Governor General of India approved a committee report that fingerprints should be used for classification of criminal records. After that year, the Kolkata Anthropometric Bureau became the world's first Fingerprint Bureau. He was working in the Calcutta Anthropometric Bureau (before it became the Fingerprint Bureau) with Azizul Haque. He and Haque were the two Indian fingerprint experts credited with primary development of the Henry Classification System (named for their supervisor, Edward Richard Henry). The Henry Classification System is still used in all English-speaking countries (primarily as the manual filing system for accessing paper archive files that have not been scanned and computerized).

Bibliography
Finger Print Companion (1927)

See also
 Azizul Haque
 Edward Henry
 Henry Classification System

References

External links
The Detective

Police officers from Kolkata
Year of birth missing
Year of death missing
Scientists from Kolkata